"High Hopes" is a song that was recorded by American musicians Bruce Springsteen and the E Street Band during their 1995 Greatest Hits sessions and eventually released on the Blood Brothers (EP) in 1996. The song was written and originally recorded in 1985 by Tim Scott McConnell. on his album High Lonesome Sound. The song was also released on a record with McConnell's band The Havalinas in 1990.

2013 re-recording

On November 25, 2013, Springsteen released a brand new recording of the song along with a music video which was the first single from his eighteenth studio album, High Hopes, released in January 2014.

Recording

Charts

References

External links
 Lyrics for "High Hopes" by Tim Scott McConnell
 Brucespringsteen.net

1987 songs
Bruce Springsteen songs
2013 singles
Columbia Records singles
Song recordings produced by Ron Aniello